is the sixth studio album by Chara, which was released on September 21, 1997. It debuted at #1 on the Japanese Oricon album charts for two weeks, and charted in the top 200 for 26 weeks. The album is Chara's most popular, and eventually sold 1,055,000 units in Japan.

The album was released at the height of Chara's popularity, after starring in the movie Swallowtail Butterfly and singing the hit theme song for the movie.

Her first single for this album was Yasashii Kimochi, released in April 1997. The pop song was used in a Shiseido 'Tessera J' commercial, boosting its popularity. The song was arranged by Zentarō Watanabe, member of the band Oh! Penelope. Chara had assisted on their album Milk & Cookies, released a month prior, lending her vocals to the song I Want You. The B-side to this single, Junior Sweet, was later also used for this ad campaign. The B-side later became the eponymous title track for the album, five months later. The single eventually sold more than 500,000 copies, making it Chara's second biggest single.

Time Machine was used as a promotional single for the album, released a month before the album's release. It is an acoustic ballad, and was written in collaboration with Bloodthirsty Butchers vocalist Hideki Yoshimura and his former bandmate Yukio Nagoshi (when a part of the band Copass Grinderz). It reached #12 on the single charts and saw some success, but nothing rivalling Yasashii Kimochi'''s. Chara later covered the Bloodthirsty Butchers song  with her then husband, actor Tadanobu Asano. The song was released on a 1999 tribute album for the band, entitled We Love Butchers.

A month and a half after the album was released, Milk, another acoustic ballad, was released as a re-cut single. The song was written as a collaboration between Chara and the writer of Des'ree's You Gotta Be, Ashley Ingram.

Yasashii Kimochi was released with an extended introduction on the album. Watashi wa Kawaii Hito to Iwaretai'''s originally released version was 6:01 in length.

Track listing

Singles

Japan sales rankings

References
 	

Chara (singer) albums
1997 albums